Osiedle Mickiewicza is one of the districts of the Polish city of Białystok. Named after Adam Mickiewicz.

External links 

Districts of Białystok
Bialystok